Alexander Stefánsson (6 October 1922 – 28 May 2008) was an Icelandic politician and former minister for social affairs from May 1983 to July 1987.

External links 

 Non auto-biography of Alexander Stefánsson on the parliament website

1922 births
1994 deaths
Alexander Stefansson
Alexander Stefansson